The Louisville, New Albany and Corydon Railroad was a  short line railway  that operated for over 100 years in Harrison County, Indiana between Corydon Junction and Corydon, a distance of 7.7 miles (12.39 km). It was sold to its main customer, Lucas Oil, on May 25, 2006. The line is now known as Lucas Oil Rail Line.

History 
The LNAC was first established as the Louisville, New Albany and Corydon Railway in 1881, for the purpose of connecting Corydon to the main Louisville-St. Louis line of the then Louisville, New Albany and St. Louis Railway (later acquired by the Southern Railway) that ran a few miles north of town. After construction was completed, the line was opened for business in 1883. In 1887, the company was reorganized as the Louisville, New Albany and Corydon Railroad, a name it kept under various owners for well over a century, until 2006.

References

Defunct Indiana railroads
Railway companies established in 1881
Railway companies established in 1887
Railway companies disestablished in 1887
Railway companies disestablished in 2006
1881 establishments in Indiana